In mathematics, the tensor product of representations is a tensor product of vector spaces underlying representations together with the factor-wise group action on the product. This construction, together with the Clebsch–Gordan procedure, can be used to generate additional irreducible representations if one already knows a few.

Definition

Group representations
If  are linear representations of a group , then their tensor product is the tensor product of vector spaces  with the linear action of  uniquely determined by the condition that

,
where  is the tensor product of linear maps.

One can extend the notion of tensor products to any finite number of representations. If V is a linear representation of a group G, then with the above linear action, the tensor algebra  is an algebraic representation of G; i.e., each element of G acts as an algebra automorphism.

Lie algebra representations
, 
where  is the identity endomorphism.

Action on linear maps 
Then  can be given the structure of a representation by defining

for all . Now, there is a natural isomorphism

as vector spaces; this vector space isomorphism is in fact an isomorphism of representations.

The trivial subrepresentation  consists of G-linear maps; i.e.,

Let  denote the endomorphism algebra of V and let A denote the subalgebra of  consisting of symmetric tensors. The main theorem of invariant theory states that A is semisimple when the characteristic of the base field is zero.

Clebsch–Gordan theory

The general problem
The tensor product of two irreducible representations  of a group or Lie algebra is usually not irreducible. It is therefore of interest to attempt to decompose  into irreducible pieces. This decomposition problem is known as the Clebsch–Gordan problem.

The SU(2) case

The prototypical example of this problem is the case of the rotation group SO(3)—or its double cover, the special unitary group SU(2). The irreducible representations of SU(2) are described by a parameter , whose possible values are

(The dimension of the representation is then .) Then the tensor product representation  then decomposes as follows:

Consider, as an example, the tensor product of the four-dimensional representation  and the three-dimensional representation . The tensor product representation  has dimension 12 and decomposes as
,
where the representations on the right-hand side have dimension 6, 4, and 2, respectively.

The SU(3) case

In the case of the group SU(3), all the irreducible representations can be generated from the standard 3-dimensional representation and its dual, as follows. To generate the representation with label , one takes the tensor product of  copies of the standard representation and  copies of the dual of the standard representation, and then takes the invariant subspace generated by the tensor product of the highest weight vectors.

Tensor power 

As with vector spaces, one can define the th tensor power of a representation  to be the vector space  with the action given above.

The symmetric and alternating square 

Over a field of characteristic zero, the symmetric and alternating squares are subrepresentations of the second tensor power. They can be used to define the Frobenius–Schur indicator, which indicates whether a given irreducible character is real, complex, or quaternionic. They are examples of Schur functors.
They are defined as follows.

Let  be a vector space.

The symmetric and alternating squares are also known as the symmetric part and antisymmetric part of the tensor product.

Properties 

The second tensor power of a linear representation  of a group  decomposes as the direct sum of the symmetric and alternating squares:

 

as representations. In particular, both are subrepresentations of the second tensor power.

If  has a basis , then the symmetric square has a basis  and the alternating square has a basis . Accordingly,

The symmetric and exterior powers 

As in multilinear algebra, over a field of characteristic zero, one can more generally define the th symmetric power  and th exterior power , which are subspaces of the th tensor power (see those pages for more detail on this construction). They are also subrepresentations, but higher tensor powers no longer decompose as their direct sum.

The Schur–Weyl duality computes the irreducible representations occurring in tensor powers of representations of the general linear group . Precisely, as an -module

where
 is an irreducible representation of the symmetric group  corresponding to a partition  of n (in decreasing order),
 is the image of the Young symmetrizer .

The mapping  is a functor called the Schur functor. It generalizes the constructions of symmetric and exterior powers:

In particular, as an G-module, the above simplifies to

where . Moreover, the multiplicity  may be computed by the Frobenius formula (or the hook length formula). For example, take . Then there are exactly three partitions:  and, as it turns out, . Hence,

Tensor products involving Schur functors 
Let  denote the Schur functor defined according to a partition . Then there is the following decomposition:

where the multiplicities  are given by the Littlewood–Richardson rule.

Given finite-dimensional vector spaces V, W, the Schur functors Sλ give the decomposition

The left-hand side can be identified with the ring k[Hom(V, W)] = k[V * ⊗ W] of polynomial functions on Hom(V, W) and so the above also gives the decomposition of k[Hom(V, W)].

Tensor products representations as representations of product groups 
Let G, H be two groups and let  and  be representations of G and H, respectively. Then we can let the direct product group  act on the tensor product space  by the formula

See also 

Dual representation
Hermite reciprocity
Clebsch–Gordan coefficients
Lie group representation
Lie algebra representation
Kronecker product

Notes

References 

 .
 
Claudio Procesi (2007) Lie Groups: an approach through invariants and representation, Springer,  .
 

Representation theory of finite groups